Sainte-Clotilde is a municipality in the  Jardins de Napierville Regional County Municipality in Quebec, Canada, situated in the Montérégie administrative region. The population as of the Canada 2021 Census was 2,646.

Before February 6, 2010 it was known as Sainte-Clotilde-de-Châteauguay.

Demographics

Population

Language

See also
List of municipalities in Quebec

References

Incorporated places in Les Jardins-de-Napierville Regional County Municipality
Municipalities in Quebec